Mommy (a mostly North American colloquial term for a mother) or Mommies may refer to:

 Mommy (1995 film), a 1995 American film
 Mommy 2: Mommy's Day, the 1997 sequel
 Mommy (2014 film), a 2014  Canadian film
 Mommy Mommy, a 2007 documentary film
 "Mommy" (American Horror Story), a 2015 TV episode
 The Mommies (comedy duo), an American female comedy duo
 The Mommies (TV series), an American sitcom aired from 1993 to 1995

See also
 Momy, a commune in France
 Mummy (disambiguation)
Mother (disambiguation)
Mama (disambiguation)
Mom (disambiguation)
Ma (disambiguation)